In the U.S. state of Oregon, U.S. Route 30, a major east–west U.S. Highway, runs from its western terminus in Astoria to the Idaho border east of Ontario.  West of Portland, US 30 generally follows the southern shore of the Columbia River; east of Portland the highway has largely been replaced with Interstate 84, though it is signed all the way across the state, and diverges from the I-84 mainline in several towns, as a de facto business route. (The state of Oregon does not sign Interstate business routes; instead it uses the designations US 30 and Oregon Route 99 (along the Interstate 5 corridor) for this purpose.) Out of all the states U.S. Route 30 traverses, it spends the most time in Oregon. At 477 miles, it is also the longest road in the state.

Route description

Astoria to Portland

US 30 begins in Astoria, at an intersection with U.S. Route 101. US 101 southbound from the intersection goes down the length of the Oregon Coast, northbound US 101 crosses the Astoria-Megler Bridge into Washington state.  US 30 proceeds east through the intersection, through downtown Astoria, and then along the southern bank of the Columbia.

East of Astoria, US 30 is known as the Lower Columbia River Highway No. 2W (see Oregon highways and routes), a designation which it carries until Portland.

Between Astoria and Portland, the highway passes through (or by) numerous Columbia River towns, such as Svensen, Knappa, Wauna, and Westport.  In Westport, one can use the Wahkiakum County Ferry to cross the Columbia to Puget Island and Cathlamet, Washington.

Continuing east, the highway passes through the communities of Woodson and Clatskanie.  East of Clatskanie, the highway runs inland from the river a bit, approaching the town of Rainier, Oregon.

Just before Rainier is an interchange providing access to the Lewis and Clark Bridge, which crosses the Columbia to Longview, Washington. After Rainier, the highway turns south, following a bend in the river, and runs parallel to Interstate 5 (which is across the river on the Washington side). Towns along the way include Goble, Deer Island, Columbia City, and St. Helens.

South of Deer Island, US 30 becomes an expressway, known locally as St. Helens Road.  The highway proceeds through the towns of Warren, Scappoose, and Burlington (as well as passing by the access road to Sauvie Island) before entering Portland. East of Scappoose is the confluence of the Columbia and Willamette Rivers.

Portland area

In northwest Portland, US 30 is sandwiched between Forest Park to the west and the Willamette River to the east. South of the  Linnton area, US 30 Bypass (Northeast Portland Highway No. 123) heads east across the St. Johns Bridge. US 30 continues south along St. Helens Road, then later on Yeon Avenue through an industrial area as it approaches Downtown Portland. On the edge of Downtown Portland, US 30 briefly becomes a freeway, utilizing part of the route of the cancelled I-505, until its interchange with I-405 at the western end of the Fremont Bridge.

US 30 crosses the Fremont Bridge (along with I-405), on the Stadium Freeway No. 61; at the eastern end of the bridge it joins Interstate 5 south for approximately one mile on the Pacific Highway No. 1 and then joins the Banfield Expressway (I-84), where it becomes the Columbia River Highway No. 2. For the remainder of its route in the Portland area, US 30 shares an alignment with I-84. I-84 passes through the eastern Portland suburbs of Fairview, Wood Village, Gresham, and Troutdale in this fashion. US 30 Bypass rejoins US 30 in Wood Village.

U.S. Route 30 Business was a spur from US 30 Byp. northeast of Downtown Portland, across I-84/US 30 to Oregon Route 99E east of Downtown, just east of the Burnside Bridge. It has not rejoined US 30 on its west end since US 30 was moved onto I-405 and I-5 around Downtown.

East of Portland

US 30 runs mostly along I-84 in Oregon east of Portland, diverting to short segments of the old surface route to act as a business route or scenic route for I-84:
Historic Columbia River Highway No. 100 1 mile (2 km) through Cascade Locks (also designated the Cascade Locks Highway)
Mount Hood Highway No. 26 3 miles (4 km) through Hood River
Historic Columbia River Highway No. 100 and Mosier-The Dalles Highway No. 292 20 miles (32 km) from Mosier to The Dalles
Pendleton Highway No. 67 7 miles (11 km) through Pendleton
La Grande-Baker Highway No. 66 5 miles (9 km) through La Grande
La Grande-Baker Highway No. 66, 22 miles (36 km) from North Powder to Baker City
Huntington Highway No. 449 8 miles (13 km) through Huntington
Ontario Spur No. 493, 1 mile (1 km) from Ontario to the Idaho state line

The sections concurrent with I-84 are part of the Columbia River Highway No. 2 west of U.S. Route 730 at Boardman and part of the Old Oregon Trail No. 6 east of U.S. Route 730.

There is also a U.S. Route 30 Business signed in the Ontario area.  This is part of the Olds Ferry-Ontario Highway No. 455.

History

Sections of the highway between The Dalles and Ontario generally follow the route of the Oregon Trail, which was used in the 19th century by American settlers to reach the Willamette Valley. US 30 was created as part of the initial United States Numbered Highway System adopted by the American Association of State Highway Officials on November 11, 1926. The number was assigned in place of US 20, which had originally been planned for the corridor in Oregon, after objections from the state government. The new national highway incorporated portions of existing state roads, including the Columbia River Highway, which was constructed between 1913 and 1922 through the Columbia River Gorge.

Before the Banfield Expressway was built, the Portland section of US 30 ran on St Helens Road to the Willamette Heights section of Portland, then on Wardway Street, then Vaughn Street, then NW 18th & 19th Avenues, then Burnside Street, and then Sandy Boulevard towards Troutdale. Several sections of the old highway use brown road markers with "Historic US 30" that were installed in the 21st century. The Interstate Highway System, approved by the federal government in 1956, included construction of a freeway in Oregon along the US 30 corridor between Portland and Ontario; it was later numbered I-80N (now I-84). The Oregon state government unsuccessfully proposed an extension to cover the rest of US 30 between Astoria and Portland in the 1950s and 1960s, which was two lanes wide and in need of funding for improvements. 

The  Astoria–Portland section had been rebuilt with fewer curves by the 1960s, but remained congested due to its use as a tourist route as well as a bypass of US 99 (and I-5) upon the removal of tolls from the Lewis and Clark Bridge near Longview, Washington. In 1969, the state government announced plans to widen the highway between Burlington and the Columbia County border, but declined to fund further projects in favor of improvements in the Portland area. The state later withdrew its proposals to upgrade the entire section to an expressway, stating that US 30 was meant to serve local traffic and could be improved to a four-lane highway instead. A project to widen US 30 near Scappoose and Warren in the 1970s was delayed by a decade due to disagreements between the state and local governments over its routing and an attempt to build a full bypass.

In 1988, US 30 was realigned along NW Yeon Avenue in Portland to alleviate residential congestion. The new route utilized an interchange with I-405 that was intended for a proposed I-505. The proposed Interstate was intended to be a  freeway spur in northwest Portland that would have connected I-405 to St. Helens Road, the latter being the original route for US 30. Funding for the freeway was withdrawn by the city government in November 1978, as it would have required condemnation and rerouting streets on a swath of land through the Northwest Industrial neighborhood. The federal government formally approved the project's cancellation in December 1979 and reallocated funds to other transportation improvements in the area.

In the 2010s, the city of Scappoose proposed the construction of a bypass to carry US 30 around the city. A similar proposal was defeated in 1971 following protests from residents over its disruption to future potential development. The $5.5 million allocation for the bypass project was redistributed by the state to improve other sections of US 30 in Columbia County.

Major intersections

See also

 U.S. Route 630
 U.S. Route 730
 U.S. Route 830

References

30
 Oregon
Columbia River Gorge
Interstate 84 (Oregon–Utah)
Transportation in Multnomah County, Oregon
Transportation in Umatilla County, Oregon
Transportation in Wasco County, Oregon
Transportation in Baker County, Oregon
Transportation in Clatsop County, Oregon
Transportation in Columbia County, Oregon
Transportation in Hood River County, Oregon
Transportation in Malheur County, Oregon
Transportation in Gilliam County, Oregon
Transportation in Union County, Oregon
Transportation in Sherman County, Oregon
Transportation in Morrow County, Oregon